Angelo Guidi (29 January 1888 – 15 November 1953) was an Italian racing cyclist. He rode in the 1924 Tour de France.

References

1888 births
1953 deaths
Italian male cyclists
Place of birth missing